A herald is an officer of arms. It also means messenger.

Herald may also refer to:

Geography
 Herald, California, United States
 Herald, Illinois, United States
 Herald Island (disambiguation)

People with the surname
 Earl S. Herald (1914–1973), American ichthyologist and television presenter 
 Toby Herald (born 1953), American politician
 William Herald (1900–1976), Australian freestyle swimmer

Publications
 Herald (newspaper), a list of newspapers containing "Herald"
 Herald (Community of Christ), a monthly periodical of Community of Christ
 Herald (Pakistan), monthly news magazine in Pakistan
 Herald House, a Christian publishing company
 Herald: An Interactive Period Drama, a 2017 digital interactive story video game
 The Heralds, a novel by Brian Killick

Film and TV
 The Herald, 1990 Iranian film starring Parviz Poorhosseini

Music
 Herald AV Publications, a record label
"The Herald", Op.34 No.11 Russian-language song by Sergei Rachmaninoff
 Herald (album), a 2021 album by Odette

Vehicles
 Handley Page Dart Herald, an aircraft
 , the name of several Royal Navy ships
 PS Herald, an 1855-built paddle steamer ferry on Sydney Harbour
 Herald (ship), one of several vessels by that name
 Triumph Herald, a car

Other uses
 The Herald (1861), a United States Supreme Court case
 The Herald (moth), a moth of the family Noctuidae

See also
 Harold (disambiguation)
 Harald (disambiguation)
 Herald Froy (disambiguation), pen name for several authors
 Mal Duncan aka The Herald, a character in Teen Titans